Gavriil Kharitonovich Popov (born 31 October 1936) is a Russian politician and economist. He served as the mayor of Moscow from 1991 until he resigned in 1992.

Biography
Born to a Greek family in Moscow, Popov graduated Moscow Lomonosov University in political economy. He joined the Soviet Communist Party in 1959 and served as a secretary of the Komsomol committee of his university. Popov remained at the faculty of economics as a graduate student, then docent, and in 1978 became dean of the faculty. Yegor Gaidar, who would become Prime Minister of Russia, was one of his students.

During Perestroika Popov became heavily involved in politics. On June 12, 1991, he became the first democratically elected mayor of Moscow. In 1990, he left the CPSU, following Boris Yeltsin's lead at the 28th Congress. He resigned in 1992 and was replaced by the vice-mayor, Yury Luzhkov. In January 2010, he and Luzhkov published an article highly critical of Yegor Gaidar.

After 1992, Popov returned to academia. He is now president of the International University in Moscow.

Footnotes

References

 Timothy J. Colton (1998). Moscow: Governing the Socialist Metropolis. Harvard University Press. .
 Marc Garcelon (2005). Revolutionary passage: from Soviet to post-Soviet Russia, 1985-2000. Temple University Press. .
 Boris Kagarlitsky (1995). Restoration in Russia: why capitalism failed. Verso. . pp. 41–49.
 Michael McFaul, Sergei Markov (1993). The troubled birth of Russian democracy: parties, personalities, and programs. Hoover Press. .
 Pekka Sutela (1991). Economic thought and economic reform in the Soviet Union. Cambridge University Press. . pp. 89, 122-165.

1936 births
Living people
Russian people of Greek descent
Mayors of Moscow
Plenipotentiary Representatives of the President of the Russian Federation in the regions
Moscow State University alumni